In physiology and medicine, depression  refers to a lowering, in particular a reduction in a specific biological variable or the functions of an organ. It is the opposite of elevation. For example, it is possible to refer to "depressed thyroid function" or to a depression of blood flow in a particular area.  

Further examples:
 Depression of the central nervous system of an animal may be expressed as drowsiness or sleep, lack of coordination and unconsciousness.
 Respiratory depression or hypoventilation.

References 

Medical terminology